Edge End is a small hamlet in west Gloucestershire, England.

Location and amenities

Edge End is about 1.5 miles NW of Coleford and about 1 mile north of the Royal Forest of Dean College.  Originally close to some mine workings, all of which have now closed, the hamlet consists of 62 private dwellings, with no pubs, shops or schools (the one village shop closed some time ago and is now a bed and breakfast establishment).

The village is effectively split in half by a village green, which is co-owned by the residents and is maintained by contributions. On the green there is one goalpost and there used to be a small park but it has been taken way. Within the village live a mix of "Foresters", the original inhabitants, many of whom can trace their family lineage back through the village's history, and incomers from further afield.  The community has a nice balance and there is a sense of community spirit evident here, with neighbours helping each other.

From the village green, perched 600 ft above sea level, on a fine day you can see north for up to 50 miles or so into Shropshire, whilst the counties of Gloucestershire, Herefordshire, Monmouthshire, Worcestershire and the Brecon Beacons are also visible. The hillside drops away to some farming communities, whilst the eastern edge of the hamlet is bounded by the main Monmouth to Gloucester road and the start of the Forest of Dean proper.  Edge End represents an excellent starting point for many local walks.

The committee has recently been rediscovered and the villagers can get involved more. A sponsored bike ride took place on Sunday 25 March 2012 and a quiz night in April 2012 which funded money for the Queen's Jubilee Fete in June. Since there has been a Bonfire and Fireworks display in November and various other small events.

History

A small book is available (from the local bookshop in Coleford) which documents the histories of the families that have lived in Edge End since the 19th century.  It was printed in 1993, based mainly on the recollections of the then elderly inhabitants of the village, most of whom have now died.

References

External links 

Hamlets in Gloucestershire
Forest of Dean